Clairval, real name Jean-Baptiste Guignard, (27 April 1735, Étampes – 1795, Paris) was an 18th-century French operatic singer (tenor), comedian and librettist.

He played with the same authority drama, comedy and opera, in a considerable number of roles. Among the most notable were:

1765: Tom Jones (part of Tom Jones) by Philidor 
1765: La fée Urgèle (part of Robert, a knight) by Egidio Duni
1768: Le Huron (an officer), by Grétry
1769: Le tableau parlant (part of Pierrot), by Grétry
1769: Le déserteur (part of Montauciel), by Monsigny
1771: Zémire et Azor, (part of Azor), by Grétry
 This opéra comique was a version of Beauty and the Beast imagined by Marmontel, where Clairval had to become ugly; but he refused to don the first scheduled disguise: an animal fur. This role was one of his best success.
1776: Les mariages samnites (part of Agathis), by Grétry
1778: L'amant jaloux, (part of Don Alonze), by Grétry
1779: Aucassin et Nicolette (Aucassin), by Grétry
1781: Les maris corrigés (part of Germival), comedy in verse by La Chabeaussière
1784: Richard Cœur-de-Lion, (part of Blondel, in which he excelled), by Grétry
1785: L'amant statue, (part of M. Michu), by Nicolas Dalayrac
1791: L'aristocrate ou le convalescent de qualité, by Fabre d'Églantine (28 January)
 This role earned Clairval the nickname "Molé of the Comédie-italienne".

References

Sources 
 Ferdinand Hoefer : Nouvelle Biographie Générale, [tome 10]
 Gaston Maugras :Le duc de Lauzun et la Cour intime de Louis XV, 1907, (p. 174)

External links 
 Clairval on 

 

People of the Ancien Régime
French operatic tenors
French opera librettists
People from Étampes
1735 births
1795 deaths